Allen Ferdinand Owen (October 9, 1816 – April 7, 1865) was an American politician and lawyer who served in the United States Congress.

Owen was born near the Yadkin River in  Wilkes County, North Carolina. He graduated from Franklin College at the University of Georgia in Athens where he was a member of the Phi Kappa Literary Society. He then graduated from Yale College in 1837, where he was a member of Skull and Bones, and from the Dane Law School at Harvard University in 1839. He was admitted to the bar in Boston, Massachusetts, in 1839 and began the practice of law in Talbotton, Georgia, in 1840.

In 1843, Owen was elected to the Georgia House of Representatives and served in that position until 1847. The next year, he served as the clerk of the state House of Representatives and was delegate to the Whig National Convention.

Owen was elected as to U.S. House of Representatives as a Whig in 1848 serving one term from March 4, 1849, through March 3, 1851; however, he became associated with the Democratic party. After his congressional career, Owen was a consul in Havana, Cuba from May through December 1851 and then resumed the practice of law in Talbotton. He died in Upatoi in Muscogee County, Georgia, in 1865 while visiting relatives and was buried in Oak Hill Cemetery in Talbotton.

References

 

1816 births
1865 deaths
People from Wilkes County, North Carolina
Democratic Party members of the Georgia House of Representatives
Georgia (U.S. state) lawyers
University of Georgia alumni
Yale College alumni
Harvard Law School alumni
Whig Party members of the United States House of Representatives from Georgia (U.S. state)
People from Talbotton, Georgia
American slave owners
19th-century American politicians
19th-century American lawyers